Four Forks may refer to:

Four Forks, Lee County, Arkansas
Four Forks, Woodruff County, Arkansas
Four Forks, Caddo County, Louisiana
Four Forks, Richland County, Louisiana
Four Forks, Mississippi
Four Forks, New Mexico
Four Forks, Virginia